Mirza Ghalib Award, commonly known as Ghalib Award, is a literary award and an honor in India presented annually in the month of December by Ghalib Academy (Ghalib Institute). It was established and named after a greatest Indian poet Ghalib. The award seeks to recognize those writers and researchers who have made "meritorious contribution" to Urdu and Persian literature. It carries an amount of cash reward ₹25,000 to 50,000 and an insignia along with a citation and a certificate of commendation.

It is generally announced by the Ghalib Institute Award Committee after a consensus, comprising uncertain number of the members and is conferred upon poets, writers and researchers at Aiwan-e-Ghalib, an auditorium in Delhi. It is recognized one of the highest awards in academic discipline, particularly in India.

Recipients
 Abul Kalam Qasmi, 2013.

See also 
 Ghalib Museum, New Delhi
 Ghalib ki Haveli

References 

Indian literary awards
Urdu literary awards
Ghalib